Helmut Lehmann may refer to:

 Helmut Lehmann (canoeist) (born 1958), Swiss sprint canoer
 Helmut Lehmann (rugby union) (born 1990), South African rugby union player
 Helmut Lehmann (politician) (1882–1959), German politician